Richards is a small lunar impact crater that is located in the northern interior of the walled plain Mendeleev, on the far side of the Moon. It lies about half-way between the craters Bergman to the west-southwest and Fischer to the east, both also within Mendeleev's interior.

This is a circular, cup-shaped crater with a small interior floor at the midpoint of the sloping inner walls. The interior sides have a higher albedo than the surroundings. There is a small crater situated along the north-northeastern edge of the rim. The crater chain named Catena Mendeleev passes just to the west of Richards, continuing in a line of small craters from the southwestern edge of Mendeleev.

References

 
 
 
 
 
 
 
 
 
 
 
 

Impact craters on the Moon